DRX, formerly known as DragonX, is a South Korean esports organization with teams competing in League of Legends, Tekken 7, Valorant and Warcraft. It previously had teams competing in Honor of Kings and Clash Royale.

DRX's League of Legends division competes in the League of Legends Champions Korea (LCK), and has won two back-to-back domestic titles (2017 Summer and 2018 Spring). In 2022, DRX won the League of Legends World Championship.

History 
DRX's League of Legends division was initially named Incredible Miracle in 2012. In January 2016, Incredible Miracle was rebranded as Longzhu Gaming, which took over the name of their sponsor, LongZhu TV.

Longzhu Gaming was sold to Kingzone in January 2018, and was rebranded as Kingzone DragonX.

In October 2019, Kingzone DragonX was renamed as DragonX, and was then abbreviated as DRX.

Honours

League of Legends

Domestic 

 League of Legends Champions Korea
Winners: 2017 Summer, 2018 Spring
Runners-up: 2020 Summer

 KeSPA Cup
Runners-up: 2017

International
League of Legends World Championship
Winners: 2022

 Mid-Season Invitational
Runners-up: 2018

Tekken 7 

 Evolution Championship Series
 Winners: 2022 (Bae "Knee" Jae-min)

Valorant 

 Valorant Challengers Korea
 Winners: 2021 Stage 1, 2021 Stage 3, 2022 Stage 1, 2022 Stage 2

 Valorant Champions
 Third place: 2022

Tournament results

League of Legends

As Longzhu Gaming

As Kingzone DragonX

As DragonX / DRX

Honor of Kings

Roster

League of Legends

Valorant

Tekken 7 
Source:

Notes

References

External links 
 Official website
 

Esports teams based in South Korea
League of Legends Champions Korea teams